Amman International Marathon is an annually held marathon in Amman, Jordan. Organized by the NGO Run Jordan, which also organizes several other marathons across the Kingdom, it was inaugurated in 2009 by King Abdullah. The marathon has routes that are 42, 21, and 10 kilometers long, and holds a separate event for children. Around 20,000 people participate every year.

Results
Key:

References

Marathons in Asia
Athletics in Jordan